The French Connection is a 1971 American neo-noir crime action thriller film starring Gene Hackman, Roy Scheider, and Fernando Rey, and directed by William Friedkin.  The screenplay, written by Ernest Tidyman, is based on Robin Moore's 1969 book of the same name. It tells the story of fictional NYPD detectives Jimmy "Popeye" Doyle and Buddy "Cloudy" Russo, whose real-life counterparts were Narcotics Detectives Eddie Egan and Sonny Grosso, in pursuit of wealthy French heroin smuggler Alain Charnier (played by Rey). 

At the 44th Academy Awards, the film earned eight nominations and won five for Best Picture, Best Actor (Hackman), Best Director, Best Film Editing, and Best Adapted Screenplay, and was also nominated for Best Supporting Actor (Scheider), Best Cinematography, and Best Sound Mixing. Tidyman also received a Golden Globe Award nomination, a Writers Guild of America Award, and an Edgar Award for his screenplay. A sequel, French Connection II, followed in 1975 with Hackman and Rey reprising their roles.

Often considered one of the greatest films ever made, The French Connection appeared in the American Film Institute's list of the best American films in 1998 and again in 2007. In 2005, the film was selected for preservation in the United States National Film Registry by the Library of Congress as being "culturally, historically, or aesthetically significant".

Plot
In Marseille, a police detective follows Alain Charnier, who runs a large heroin-smuggling syndicate. The policeman is murdered by Charnier's hitman, Pierre Nicoli. Charnier plans to smuggle $32 million worth of heroin into the United States by hiding it in the car of his unsuspecting friend, television personality Henri Devereaux, who is traveling to New York by ship. In New York City, detectives Jimmy "Popeye" Doyle and Buddy "Cloudy" Russo go out for drinks at the Copacabana. Popeye notices Salvatore "Sal" Boca and his young wife, Angie, entertaining mobsters involved in narcotics. They tail the couple and establish a link between the Bocas and lawyer Joel Weinstock, a major buyer in the narcotics underworld. Popeye learns that a massive shipment of heroin will arrive within two weeks. The detectives convince their supervisor to wiretap the Bocas' phones. Popeye and Cloudy are joined by federal agents Mulderig and Klein.

Devereaux's vehicle arrives in New York City. Boca is anxious to make the purchase while Weinstock urges patience, knowing they are being surveiled. Charnier realizes he is as well, "makes" Popeye and escapes on a departing subway shuttle at Grand Central Station. To shake his tail, he has Boca meet him in Washington D.C., where Boca asks for a delay to avoid the police. Charnier is impatient and wants to conclude the deal quickly. On the flight back to New York City, Nicoli offers to kill Popeye, but Charnier objects, knowing that Popeye would be replaced by another policeman. Nicoli insists, however, saying they will be back in France before a replacement is assigned. Soon after, Nicoli attempts to shoot Popeye but misses. Popeye chases Nicoli, who boards an elevated train. Popeye shouts to a policeman on the train to stop Nicoli and then commandeers a passenger car. He gives chase, accidentally crashing into several vehicles on the way.

Realizing he is being pursued, Nicoli works his way forward through the carriages, shoots a policeman who tries to intervene, and hijacks the motorman at gunpoint. He forces him to drive straight through the next station, and shoots the train conductor. The motorman passes out, and they are just about to slam into a stationary train when an emergency trackside brake engages, hurling the assassin violently to the floor. A battered Popeye arrives to see the killer descending from the platform. Nicoli sees Popeye, turns to run, but is shot dead. After a lengthy stakeout, Popeye impounds Devereaux's Lincoln. In a police garage he and his team tear the car apart piece by piece searching for the drugs, but seemingly come up empty handed. Then Cloudy notes that the vehicle's shipping weight is 120 pounds over its listed manufacturer's weight, indicating that the contraband must still be in the car. Further search reveals heroin packages hidden inside the rocker panels. The police reassemble and return the car to Devereaux, who delivers it to Charnier.

Charnier drives to an old factory on Wards Island to meet Weinstock and deliver the drugs. After Charnier has the rocker panel covers removed, Weinstock's chemist tests one of the bags and confirms its quality. Charnier removes the drugs and hides the money, concealing it inside the rocker panels of another car purchased at an auction of junk cars, which he will take back to France. Charnier and Sal drive off in the Lincoln, but hit a roadblock with a large contingent of police led by Popeye. The police chase the Lincoln back to the factory, where Boca is killed during a shootout while most of the other criminals surrender. Charnier escapes into a nearby warehouse with Popeye and Cloudy in pursuit. Popeye sees a shadowy figure in the distance and opens fire too late to heed a warning, killing Mulderig. Undaunted, Popeye tells Cloudy that he will get Charnier. After reloading his gun, Popeye runs into another room and a single gunshot is heard. 

Title cards describe the fates of various characters: Weinstock was indicted, but his case was dismissed for "lack of proper evidence"; Angie Boca received a suspended sentence for an unspecified misdemeanor; Lou Boca (Sal’s brother, an accessory to the handoff) received a reduced sentence; Devereaux served four years in a federal penitentiary for conspiracy; and Charnier was never caught. Popeye and Cloudy were transferred out of the narcotics division and reassigned.

Cast

Production
The film was originally set up at National General Pictures but they later dropped it and Richard Zanuck and David Brown offered to make it at Fox with a production budget of $1.5 million. The film came in $300,000 over budget at a total cost of $1.8 million.

In an audio commentary track recorded by Friedkin for the Collector's Edition DVD release of the film, Friedkin notes that the film's documentary-like realism was the direct result of the influence of having seen Z, a French film by Costa-Gavras. Friedkin mentioned the film's influence on him when directing The French Connection:

  The film was among the earliest to show the World Trade Center: the completed North Tower and the partially completed South Tower are seen in the background of the scenes at the shipyard following Devereaux's arrival in New York.

Friedkin credits his decision to direct the movie to a discussion with film director Howard Hawks, whose daughter was living with Friedkin at the time. Friedkin asked Hawks what he thought of his movies, to which Hawks bluntly replied that they were "lousy." Instead Hawks recommended that he "Make a good chase. Make one better than anyone's done."

Casting
Though the cast ultimately proved to be one of the film's greatest strengths, Friedkin had problems with casting choices from the start. He was strongly opposed to the choice of Gene Hackman for the lead, and actually first considered Paul Newman (out of the budget range), then Jackie Gleason, Peter Boyle and a New York columnist, Jimmy Breslin, who had never acted before. However, Gleason, at that time, was considered box-office poison by the studio after his film Gigot had flopped several years before, Boyle declined the role after disapproving of the violent theme of the film, and Breslin refused to get behind the wheel of a car, which was required of Popeye's character for an integral car chase scene. Steve McQueen was also considered, but he did not want to do another police film after Bullitt and, as with Newman, his fee would have exceeded the movie's budget. Tough guy Charles Bronson was also considered for the role. Lee Marvin, James Caan, and Robert Mitchum were also considered; all turned it down. Friedkin almost settled for Rod Taylor (who had actively pursued the role, according to Hackman), another choice the studio approved, before he went with Hackman.

The casting of Fernando Rey as the main French heroin smuggler, Alain Charnier (irreverently referred to throughout the film as "Frog One"), resulted from mistaken identity. Friedkin had seen Luis Buñuel's 1967 French film Belle de Jour and had been impressed by the performance of Francisco Rabal, who had a small role in the film. However, Friedkin did not know his name, and remembered only that he was a Spanish actor. He asked his casting director to find the actor, and the casting director instead contacted Rey, a Spanish actor who had appeared in several other films directed by Buñuel. After Rabal was finally reached, they discovered he spoke neither French nor English, and Rey was kept in the film. Friedkin recounts his casting opinions in Making the Connection: The Untold Stories (2001). Extra feature on 2001 Five Star Collection edition of DVD release.</ref>After screening the film's final cut, Rey's French was deemed unacceptable by the filmmakers. They decided to dub his French while preserving his English dialogue.

Comparison to actual people and events
The plot centers on drug smuggling in the 1960s and early 1970s, when most of the heroin illegally imported into the East Coast came to the United States through France (see French Connection).

The total amount smuggled during the many transatlantic voyages of this DS was  according to arrested smuggler Jacques Bousquet.

In addition to the two main protagonists, several of the fictional characters depicted in the film also have real-life counterparts. The Alain Charnier character is based upon Jean Jehan, who was arrested later in Paris for drug trafficking, though he was not extradited since France does not extradite its citizens. Sal Boca is based on Pasquale "Patsy" Fuca, and his brother Anthony. Angie Boca is based on Patsy's wife Barbara, who later wrote a book with Robin Moore detailing her life with Patsy. The Fucas and their uncle were part of a heroin-dealing crew that worked with some of the New York City crime families.

Henri Devereaux, who takes the fall for importing the film's drug-laden Lincoln into New York City, is based on Jacques Angelvin, a television actor arrested and sentenced to three to six years in a federal penitentiary for his role, serving about four before returning to France and turning to real estate. The Joel Weinstock character is, according to the director's commentary, a composite of several similar drug dealer financiers.

Car chase
The film is often cited as featuring one of the greatest car chase sequences in movie history. The chase involves Popeye commandeering a civilian's car (a 1971 Pontiac LeMans) and then frantically chasing an elevated train, on which a hitman is trying to escape. At that point, the train hits a train stop, but is going too fast to stop in time and collides with the train ahead of it, which has just left the station.

The most famous shot of the chase is made from a front bumper mount and shows a low-angle point of view shot of the streets racing by. Director of photography Owen Roizman wrote in American Cinematographer magazine in 1972 that the camera was undercranked to 18 frames per second to enhance the sense of speed; this effect can be seen on a car at a red light whose exhaust pipe is pumping smoke at an accelerated rate. Other shots involved stunt drivers who were supposed to barely miss hitting the speeding car, but due to errors in timing, accidental collisions occurred and were left in the final film. Friedkin said that he used Santana's cover of Peter Green's song "Black Magic Woman" during editing to help shape the chase sequence, though the song does not appear in the film, "it [the chase scene] did have a sort of pre-ordained rhythm to it that came from the music."

The scene concludes with Doyle confronting Nicoli the hitman at the stairs leading to the subway and shooting him as he tries to run back up them, its climax captured as a still shot in a theatrical release movie poster for the film. Many of the police officers acting as advisers for the film objected to the scene on the grounds that shooting a suspect in the back was simply murder, not self-defense, but director Friedkin stood by it, stating that he was "secure in my conviction that that's exactly what Eddie Egan (the model for Doyle) would have done and Eddie was on the set while all of this was being shot."

Filming locations
The French Connection was filmed in the following locations:

 50th Street and First Avenue, New York City (where Doyle waits outside the restaurant)
 82nd Street and Fifth Avenue (near the Metropolitan Museum of Art), New York City, (Weinstock's apartment)
 86th Street, Brooklyn, New York City (the chase scene) 
 91 Wyckoff Avenue, Bushwick, Brooklyn (Sal and Angie's Cafe)
 940 2nd Avenue, Manhattan (where Charnier and Nicoli buy fruit and Popeye is watching)
 177 Mulberry Street near Broome street, Little Italy, New York City  (where Sal makes a drop)
 Avenue De L'Amiral Ganteaume, Cassis, Bouches-du-Rhône, France (Charnier's house)
 Château d'If, Marseille, Bouches-du-Rhône, France (where Charnier and Nicoli meet Devereaux) 
 Chez Fon Fon, Rue Du Vallon Des Auffes, Marseille, Bouches-du-Rhône, France (where Charnier dines)
 Columbia Heights, Brooklyn, New York City (where Sal parks the Lincoln)
 Le Copain, 891 First Ave, New York City (where Charnier dines)
 Doral Park Avenue Hotel (now 70 Park Avenue Hotel), 38th Street and Park Avenue, New York City (Devereaux's hotel)
 Dover street near by the Brooklyn Bridge, New York City (where Sal leaves the Lincoln)
 Forest Avenue, Ridgewood, Queens, New York City
 42nd Street Shuttle platform at Grand Central Terminal, Manhattan, New York City
 Henry Hudson Parkway Route 9A at Junction 24 (car accident)
 Marlboro Housing Project, Avenues V, W, and X off Stillwell Avenue, Brooklyn, New York City (where Popeye lives)
 Marseille, Bouches-du-Rhône, France
 Montee Des Accoules, Marseille, Bouches-du-Rhône, France
 Onderdonk Avenue, Ridgewood, Queens, New York City
 Plage du bestouan, Cassis, Bouches-du-Rhône, France 
 Putnam Avenue, Ridgewood, Queens, New York City
 Randalls Island, East River, New York City
 Ratner's Restaurant, 138 Delancey Street, New York City (where Sal and Angie emerge)
 Remsen Street, Brooklyn, New York City (where Charnier and Nicoli watch the car being unloaded)
 Rio Piedras (now demolished), 912 Broadway, Brooklyn, New York City (where the Santa Claus chase starts) 
 Rapid Park Garage, East 38th Street near Park Avenue, New York City (where Cloudy follows Sal)
 Ronaldo Maia Flowers, 27 East 67th Street at Madison, New York City (where Charnier gives Popeye the slip)
 The Roosevelt Hotel, 45th Street and Madison Avenue, Manhattan, New York City
 Rue des Moulins off Rue Du Panier, Old Town of Marseille, Bouches-du-Rhône, France (where the French policeman with the bread walks)
 La Samaritaine at 2 Quai Du Port, Marseille, Bouches-du-Rhône, France
 South Street at Market Street at the foot of Manhattan Bridge, New York City (where Doyle emerges from a bar)
 Triborough Bridge to Randall's Island toll bridge at the east end of 125th Street, New York City
 Wards Island, New York City (the final shootout)
 The National Mall in Washington, D.C., near The Capitol (where Charnier and Sal meet)
 Westbury Hotel, 15 East 69th Street, Manhattan, New York City (Charnier's hotel)

Reception
Roger Ebert of the Chicago Sun-Times gave the film 4 out of 4 stars and ranked it as one of the best films of 1971. Roger Greenspun of The New York Times wrote that The French Connection "is in fact a very good new kind of movie, and that in spite of its being composed of such ancient material as cops and crooks, with thrills and chases, and lots of shoot-'em-up." A review in Variety stated, "So many changes have been made in Robin Moore's taut, factual reprise of one of the biggest narcotics hauls in New York police history that only the skeleton remains, but producer Philip D'Antoni and screenwriter Ernest Tidyman have added enough fictional flesh to provide director William Friedkin and his overall topnotch cast with plenty of material, and they make the most of it." Gene Siskel of the Chicago Tribune awarded a full 4 stars out of 4 and raved, "From the moment a street-corner Santa Claus chases a drug pusher thru the Bedford-Stuyvesant section of Brooklyn, to the final shootout on deserted Ward's Island, 'The French Connection' is a gutty, flatout thriller, far superior to any caper film of recent vintage."

Charles Champlin of the Los Angeles Times called it "every bit as entertaining as 'Bullitt,' a slam-bang, suspenseful, plain-spoken, sardonically funny, furiously paced melodrama. But because it has dropped the romance and starry glamor of Steve McQueen and added a strong sociological concern, 'The French Connection' is even more interesting, thought-provoking and reverberating." Gary Arnold of The Washington Post called the film "an undeniably sensational movie, a fast, tense, explosively vicious little cops-and-robbers enterprise" with "a deliberately nervewracking, runaway quality ... It's a cheap thrill in the same way that a roller coaster ride is a cheap thrill. It seems altogether appropriate that the showiest sequence intercuts between a runaway train and a recklessly speeding car." In his book Reverse Angle, John Simon wrote "Friedkin has used New York locations better than anyone to day," "[t]he performances are all good", and "Owen Roizman's cinematography, grainy and grimy, is a brilliant rendering of urban blight."

Pauline Kael of The New Yorker was generally negative, writing, "It's not what I want not because it fails (it doesn't fail), but because of what it is. It is, I think, what we once feared mass entertainment might become: jolts for jocks. There's nothing in the movie that you enjoy thinking about afterward—nothing especially clever except the timing of the subway-door-and-umbrella sequence. Every other effect of the movie—even the climactic car-versus-runaway-elevated-train chase—is achieved by noise, speed, and brutality." David Pirie of The Monthly Film Bulletin called the film "consistently exciting" and Gene Hackman "extremely convincing as Doyle, trailing his suspects with a shambling determination; but there are times when the film (or at any rate the script) seems to be applauding aspects of his character which are more repulsive than sympathetic. Whereas in The Detective or Bullitt the hero's attention was directed unmistakably towards liberal ends (crooked businessmen, corrupt local officials, etc.) Doyle spends a fair part of his time beating up sullen blacks in alleys and bars. These violent sequences are almost all presented racily and amusingly, stressing Doyle's 'lovable' toughness as he manhandles and arrests petty criminals, usually adding a quip like 'Lock them up and throw away the key.'"

The film has an approval rating on Rotten Tomatoes of 96% based on 89 reviews, with an average rating of 8.8/10. The website's critical consensus reads, "Realistic, fast-paced and uncommonly smart, The French Connection is bolstered by stellar performances by Gene Hackman and Roy Scheider, not to mention William Friedkin's thrilling production." On Metacritic the film has a score of 94% based on reviews from 18 critics, indicating "universal acclaim".

In 2014, Time Out listed The French Connection as the 31st best action film of all time, according to a poll of several film critics, directors, actors and stunt actors.

The French Connection has been described as a neo-noir film by some authors.

The Japanese filmmaker Akira Kurosawa cited The French Connection as one of his favorite films.

Director David Fincher cited The French Connection as one of the five films that "had a Profound Impact on my Life" and served as an important influence on the cinematography on his film Seven.

The actor Brad Pitt is an admirer of the film and has cited it as one of the main reasons why he chose to participate in David Fincher's film Seven.

Director Steven Spielberg said that he studied The French Connection in preparation for his 2005 historical action thriller film, Munich.

Benny Safdie of the Safdie Brothers named The French Connection as one of his top five favorite films of all time.

Awards and nominations

The American Film Institute recognizes The French Connection on several of its lists:
 AFI's 100 Years...100 Movies - #70
 AFI's 100 Years...100 Movies (10th Anniversary Edition) - #93
 AFI's 100 Years…100 Thrills - #8
 AFI's 100 Years…100 Heroes and Villains: Jimmy "Popeye" Doyle - #44 Hero

In 2012, the Motion Picture Editors Guild listed the film as the tenth best-edited film of all time based on a survey of its membership.

Home media releases
The French Connection has been issued in a number of home video formats. On September 25, 2001, the film was released on VHS and DVD, with both formats being released in box sets featuring both the film and its sequel, French Connection II. For a 2009 reissue on Blu-ray, William Friedkin controversially altered the film's color timing to give it a "colder" look. Cinematographer Owen Roizman, who was not consulted about the changes, dismissed the new transfer as "atrocious". On March 18, 2012, a new Blu-ray transfer of the movie was released. This time the color-timing was supervised by both Friedkin and Roizman, and the desaturated and sometimes over-grainy look of the 2009 edition have been corrected.

Sequels and adaptations
 French Connection II (1975) is a fictional sequel.
 NBC-TV aired a made-for-TV movie, Popeye Doyle (1986), another fictional sequel starring Ed O'Neill in the title role.

See also
 Crime film
 List of American films of 1971

Explanatory notes

References

Further reading
 Berliner, Todd. "The Genre Film as Booby Trap: 1970s Genre Bending and 'The French Connection'." Cinema Journal (2001): 25-46. online
 
 
 
 
 
 King, Neal, Rayanne Streeter, and Talitha Rose. "Cultural Studies Approaches to the Study of Crime in Film and on Television." Oxford Research Encyclopedia of Criminology and Criminal Justice (2016). online

 Lichtenfeld, Eric. Action speaks louder: Violence, spectacle, and the American action movie (Wesleyan University Press, 2007).

 Ramaeker, Paul. "Realism, revisionism and visual style: The French Connection and the New Hollywood policier." New Review of Film and Television Studies 8.2 (2010): 144-163. online

External links

 
 
 
 
 
 The French Connection essay by Daniel Eagan in America's Film Legacy: The Authoritative Guide to the Landmark Movies in the National Film Registry, A&C Black, 2010, pages 674-676

1971 films
1970s action thriller films
1970s chase films
1970s crime thriller films
20th Century Fox films
Action films based on actual events
American action thriller films
American chase films
American crime thriller films
Best Drama Picture Golden Globe winners
Best Picture Academy Award winners
Crime films based on actual events
Edgar Award-winning works
French-language American films
Fictional portrayals of the New York City Police Department
Films about the New York City Police Department
Films about automobiles
Films about the French Connection
Films about the American Mafia
Films about Jewish-American organized crime
Films about organized crime in France
20th Century Studios franchises
Films whose director won the Best Directing Academy Award
Films whose director won the Best Director Golden Globe
Films directed by William Friedkin
Films featuring a Best Actor Academy Award-winning performance
Films featuring a Best Drama Actor Golden Globe winning performance
Films set in Brooklyn
Films set in Marseille
Films set in New York City
Films shot in France
Films shot in New York City
Films whose editor won the Best Film Editing Academy Award
Films whose writer won the Best Adapted Screenplay Academy Award
American police detective films
Films about police misconduct
Rail transport films
United States National Film Registry films
Buddy drama films
Films scored by Don Ellis
American neo-noir films
Films based on non-fiction books about organized crime
Films shot in Marseille
1970s English-language films
1970s American films